Denis Godeas (born 25 July 1975) is an Italian assistant coach for Italian Serie D club Cjarlins Muzane.

He amassed Serie B totals of 364 games and 109 goals over the course of 13 seasons, mainly at the service of Triestina. In Serie A he represented Como, Palermo and Chievo, in a 23-year professional career.

Football career
Godeas in Cormons, Province of Gorizia. He started his career at U.S. Triestina Calcio in Serie C1, moving to Udinese Calcio in Serie B in 1994 and spending the following seasons on loan to several teams in the third level.

In the 1998 summer, Godeas joined A.S. Livorno Calcio of division three, returning to Triestina in February of the following year, with the club in the fourth tier. Subsequently, he had his first abroad experience, signing with Holland's De Graafschap but returning home shortly after, joining Treviso F.B.C. 1993 in the second division.

In 2000–01, Godeas moved to F.C. Messina Peloro in level three. He helped to promotion in his first season and scored 15 goals in the following campaign as the Sicily side finished in 16th position, thus avoiding relegation.

Godeas was signed by Como Calcio 1907 in 2002. He made his Serie A debut on 14 September of that year against Empoli FC, and finished the season on loan to A.S. Bari in the second division.

Godeas returned to Triestina for a third spell in 2003, with the Friuli–Venezia Giulia club in division two. He scored regularly during this stint, and was signed by top flight's U.S. Città di Palermo in January 2006, at nearly 31 years of age. He played 15 league games for his new team, adding three appearances in the UEFA Cup, netting against Slavia Prague in the round-of-32 (2–2 aggregate win).

Godeas joined A.C. Chievo Verona in the 2006 summer, as part of the transfer deal involving Amauri. He appeared rarely during the campaign, also being loaned to second tier side A.C. Mantova and contributing with six goals as they fell short of the promotion zone, finishing eighth with 64 points.

In 2007–08, still with Mantova, 32-year-old Godeas was crowned the competition's topscorer, but his team finished one place lower than the previous season. After one more year, he signed with Triestina in the same division.

In late August 2013, Godeas returned to Triestina. He retired the following year, aged 39.

References

External links

Gazzetta dello Sport profile  

1975 births
Living people
People from Cormons
Italian footballers
Association football forwards
Serie A players
Serie B players
Serie C players
Serie D players
U.S. Triestina Calcio 1918 players
Udinese Calcio players
A.C. Prato players
U.S. Cremonese players
U.S. Livorno 1915 players
Treviso F.B.C. 1993 players
A.C.R. Messina players
Como 1907 players
S.S.C. Bari players
Palermo F.C. players
A.C. ChievoVerona players
Mantova 1911 players
Venezia F.C. players
De Graafschap players
Italian expatriate footballers
Expatriate footballers in the Netherlands
Footballers from Friuli Venezia Giulia